Il Barone Rampante (sometimes known as Benetton Junior) was a Formula 3000 team created by Giuseppe Cipriani. The team took its name from the original Italian title of Italo Calvino's 1957 book The Baron in the Trees.

The team ran in International Formula 3000 from 1991 to 1993 with drivers like Alessandro Zanardi (second in 1991), Rubens Barrichello (third in 1992), Andrea Montermini (second in 1992), Jan Lammers, Max Angelelli and Pedro Chaves.

The team never won a title. Its best results were two second places by Zanardi in 1991 and Montermini in 1992.

They tried to join Formula One as a B-team for Benetton in 1992, through an attempt to buy Fondmetal and Tyrrell, but with no success.

Cipriani revived the name in 2017 to race in the 2017 World Series Formula V8 3.5 season, driving alongside fellow countryman Damiano Fioravanti. The team finished seventh and last in the teams' standings, being the only team to not have won any race during the season.

References

Italian auto racing teams
International Formula 3000 teams
World Series Formula V8 3.5 teams